The following is a partial listing of FV ("fighting vehicle") numbers as used by the British Army. Some vehicles do not have FV numbers (e.g. the AS-90).

0–999

FV101: Scorpion light tank with 76 mm gun
FV102: Striker 5 Swingfire missile launcher
FV103: Spartan armoured personnel carrier
FV104: Samaritan ambulance
FV105: Sultan armoured command vehicle
FV106: Samson armoured recovery vehicle
FV107: Scimitar light tank with 30 mm Rarden Cannon
FV109: Workhorse - replacement for FV432
FV120: Spartan with Milan compact turret
FV180: Combat Engineering Tractor
FV201: "Universal Tank" (A45) 17 pdr (later 20 pdr) gun (predecessor of FV221 Caernarvon)
FV205: Self-propelled medium anti-tank gun based on Conqueror tank chassis
FV207: An SPG variant on the basis of the FV214 (Conqueror). It was planned to mount either a 105 mm, 140 mm, or 152 mm howitzer in a closed armoured cabin. The vehicle existed only in blueprints.
FV209: Universal ARV - not built
FV212: "Assault Personnel Carrier" - not built
FV214: Conqueror Heavy Gun Tank
FV215: known as  "Tank, Heavy No. 2, 183mm Gun" or "Heavy Anti-Tank Gun, SP" - with 183 mm gun on FV214 (Conqueror) tank chassis. Project cancelled in 1957.
FV216: Tank, Heavy, Royal Engineers, Flail
FV217: Conqueror Casement Test Rig 120 mm SPG - project cancelled.
FV219: ARV Mk I FV201 variant . Eight completed.
FV221: Caernarvon medium gun tank (FV201 variant)
FV222: Conqueror ARV Mk II
FV223: Bridgelayer ARK
FV301:  21 ton light tank with 77 mm gun (Project cancelled in 1953)
FV302:  GPO/CPO Command Vehicle based on FV301
FV303:  20 pdr Self Propelled Gun based on FV301
FV304:  25 pdr Self Propelled Gun based on FV301
FV305:  5.5 inch Self Propelled Gun based on FV301
FV306:  Light Armoured Recovery Vehicle based on FV301
FV307:  Radar Vehicle based on FV301
FV308:  Field Artillery Tractor based on FV301
FV309:  RA section vehicle based on FV301
FV310:  Armoured Personnel Carrier based on FV301
FV311:  Armoured Load Carrier based on FV301
FV400: 17.6 ton tank with 77 mm gun
FV401: Cambridge series of carriers
FV402: Armoured Observation Post vehicle
FV420: Tracked Load Carrier, 5 ton.
FV421: 120 mm lightweight Tank Destroyer based on FV401.
FV421: Cargo Carrier. FV432 predecessor.
FV422: Personnel Carrier
FV423: 5 ton Carrier Command vehicle
FV424: Carrier Royal Engineers
FV425: Carrier REME
FV426: Carrier Tracked Launcher, Orange William HESH AT missile
FV430: A series of armoured fighting vehicles of the British Army built on a common chassis
FV432: Armoured Personnel Carrier
FV433: Abbot self-propelled gun - 105 mm SP gun on FV432 chassis
FV434: Armoured Repair Vehicle - engineering version of FV432
FV435: Wavell communications vehicle
FV436: Trial version of FV432 variant fitted with Green Archer radar, did not enter service.  Number subsequently used for brigade and division HQ staff vehicles.
FV437: Pathfinder vehicle based on FV432 with snorkel gear
FV438: Swingfire anti-tank missile carrier
FV439: Signals version of FV432.
FV510: Warrior Mechanised Combat Vehicle (MCV)
FV511: Warrior Infantry Command Vehicle
FV512: Warrior Repair Vehicle
FV513: Warrior Recovery Vehicle
FV514: Warrior Observation Post Vehicle
FV515: Warrior Battery Command Vehicle
FV601: Saladin
FV603: Saracen
FV604:  Saracen Regimental CP
FV610:  Saracen RA CP (high roof)
FV620: Alvis Stalwart - "Truck, High Mobility Load Carrier, 5-Ton, 6 x 6, Stalwart Mk. 1"
FV622: Alvis Stalwart - "Truck, High Mobility Load Carrier, 5-Ton, 6 x 6, Stalwart Mk. 2" 
FV623: Alvis Stalwart - "Truck, High Mobility Load Carrier, 5-Ton, 6 x 6, Stalwart Mk. 2, Limber" 
FV624: Alvis Stalwart- "Truck, High Mobility Load Carrier, 5-Ton, 6 x 6, Stalwart Mk. 2, REME Fitters" 
FV701:  Scout Car Liaison, Ferret Mk 1/1
FV703:  Scout Car Reconnaissance/GW, Ferret Mk 2/6
FV704:  Scout Car Liaison Ferret Mk 1/2
FV711:  Scout Car Reconnaissance, Ferret Mk 4 (Big-wheeled)
FV712:  Scout Car Reconnaissance/GW, Ferret Mk 5 (Big-wheeled)
FV721:  Combat Vehicle Reconnaissance (Wheeled), Fox Mk 1/2
FV722:  Reconnaissance Vehicle (Wheeled), Vixen Mk1

1000–9999

FV1103: Leyland Martian Medium Artillery Tractor, 10-ton, 6 × 6 Leyland
FV1119:  Tractor 10-ton Heavy 6 × 6 Leyland Recovery
FV1601:  Truck Cargo 1-ton 4 × 4 GS, Humber
FV1609:  Humber Pig prototype
FV1611:  Truck 1 Ton, Armoured 4 × 4 Humber Pig
FV1612:  Humber Pig FFW/FFR
FV1613:  Humber Pig Armoured Ambulance
FV1620:  Humber Hornet Truck 1 Ton, Air-portable Launcher, 4 × 4 Hornet (Malkara launcher)
FV1801A: Truck, 1/4ton, CT, 4 × 4 Austin, Mk.1. (Austin Champ)
FV1802:  Truck, Utility, CT, 4 × 4, Austin (prototypes only)
FV2721a: Trailer - Centurion AVRE
FV3011: Semi-trailer, 50 Ton - used with Thornycroft Antar tractor unit
FV3601:  Trailer Transporter 50-ton
FV3621:  Trailer Low-loader 20-ton
FV3801: Gun Tractor Centurion components
FV3802: 25 pdr SP Artillery Field Equipments Centurion components
FV3803: Command Post Vehicle Centurion components
FV3804: Ammunition Vehicle Centurion components
FV3805: 5.5 inch SP guns Prototype only
FV3806: 7.2 inch SP Gun Centurion components
FV3901: Churchill Linked ARK
FV3902: Churchill VII Flail also known as "TOAD"
FV3903: Churchill VII AVRE Tank Infantry Dozer
FV3904: Churchill VII APC
FV4001: Centurion mineclearer
FV4002: Centurion  Mk 5 Bridgelayer
FV4003: Centurion Mk 5 AVRE 165 Centurion AVRE 165
FV4004: Conway SPG based on a Centurion Mark III hull with a larger calibre 120 mm L1 gun in a turret made from rolled plate. To be an interim design until Conqueror tank entered service. One built before the project was cancelled in 1951.
FV4005: Heavy 183 mm SPG (two prototypes, one with a limited-traverse casemate mount, the 'Stage 2' with a tall, fully traversing turret)
FV4006: Centurion ARV Mk 2
FV4007: Centurion Mk 1, 2, 3, 4, 7, 8/1, 8/2
FV4008: Centurion DD
FV4009: Tank, Medium
FV4010: Tank Destroyer, Medium Malkara missile vehicle on Centurion chassis
FV4011: Centurion Mk 5
FV4012: Centurion Mk 7/1, 7/2
FV4013: Centurion Mk 3 ARV
FV4014: Tank, Medium
FV4015: Centurion Mk 9
FV4016: Centurion ARK Bridgelayer
FV4017: Centurion Mk 10
FV4018: Centurion BARV - Beach Armoured Recovery Vehicle
FV4019: Centurion Mk 5 Bulldozer
FV4030: Shir series Designed for Iran. Challenger predecessors
FV4030/2: Shir 1 120 mm MBT Challenger predecessor. Renamed Khalid for supply to Jordan
FV4030/3: Shir 2
FV4030/4: Challenger 1
FV4034: Challenger 2
FV4101: Tank, Medium gun, Charioteer
FV4201: Chieftain tank
FV4201: Medium Gun Tank No.2 "40t Centurion"
FV4202: "40 ton Centurion" 20 pounder gun, mantlet-less Chieftain predecessor based on Centurion Mk 7
FV4203: Centurion AVRE 105
FV4204: Chieftain ARV Mk 5 and ARRV (Armoured Repair and Recovery Vehicle)
FV4205: AVLB Chieftain Bridgelayer
FV4207: Centurion Mk 9 VHF
FV4211: Experimental (Aluminium) Chieftain (1971)
FV4333: Stormer APC
FV4401: Contentious - British experiment along S-Tank lines for lightweight tank. 3 prototypes.
FV4501: Armoured mine clearer
FV4601: MBT-80 (3 experimental vehicles).

9999 + 
FV11002:  Tractor 10-ton, 6 x 6 GS, AEC Militant Mk 2
FV11003:  Truck Crane Bridging 6 x 6, AEC Militant
FV11005:  Truck End-tipper 6 x 6, AEC Militant
FV11009:  Truck, Fuel Tanker 2,500 gallon 6 x 6, AEC Militant
FV11018:  Truck Cargo 10-ton 6 x 6 GS, AEC Militant Mk 1
FV11010:  Tractor 10-ton 6 x 6 GS, AEC Militant
FV11014:  Truck 10-ton 6 x 6 GS, AEC Excavator
FV11021:  BV202E Articulated Sno-Cat
FV11044:  Tractor 10-ton 6 x 6 Heavy Recovery, AEC
FV11047:  Truck Cargo 10-ton 6 x 6 GS, AEC Militant Mk 3
FV11061:  Armoured Command Vehicle, Heavy, AEC 10 ton 6 x 6
FV11301:  Tractor 10-ton 6 x 6 GS, Scammell Recovery
FV12002:  Tractor 30-ton 6 x 4 GS, Thornycroft Antar Mk 2
FV12003:  Tractor 30-ton 6 x 4 GS, Thornycroft Antar (ballast body)
FV12004:  Tractor 30-ton 6 x 4 GS, Thornycroft Antar Mk 3
FV12101:  Tractor 20-ton 6 x 6 GS, Scammell
FV12105:  Tractor 20-ton 6 x 6 GS, Scammell Mk 2
FV13111:  Truck  End-tipper 4-ton 4 x 4, Bedford
FV13112:  Truck Cargo 4-ton 4 x 4 GS, Bedford
FV13113:  Truck Mobile Workshop 4-ton 4 x 4, Bedford
FV13142:  Truck Cargo 4-ton 4 x 4 Airportable, Bedford
FV13165:  Truck Mobile Dental Clinic 4-ton 4 x 4, Bedford
FV13201:  Truck 3-ton 4 x 4 GS, Commer
FV13219:  Truck End-tipper 3-ton 4 x 4, Commer
FV13206:  Truck Mobile Workshop 3-ton 4 x 4, Commer
FV16001:  Truck Cargo 1-ton 4 x 4 GS, Austin
FV16003:  Truck 1-ton 4 x 4 Wireless, Austin
FV16008:  Truck 1-ton 4 x 4 200 Water-tanker, Austin
FV16100:  Truck 1-ton 4 x 4, (series, Morris)
FV18005:  Truck 3/4-ton 4 x 4 Ambulance Land Rover Series I
FV18008:  Truck 3/4-ton 4 x 4 Ambulance Land Rover Series I
FV18032:  Truck 3/4-ton 4 x 4 Line-laying
FV18044:  Truck 3/4-ton 4 x 4 Ambulance Land Rover Series II
FV18061:  Truck 3/4-ton 4 x 4 L.W.B GS (General Service)
FV18062:  Truck 3/4-ton 4 x 4 L.W.B FFR (Fitted for Radio)
FV18067:  Truck 3/4-ton 4 x 4 Ambulance 2/4 Stretcher
FV23225:  Truck Light Recovery 4-ton 4 x 4, Bedford
FV30011:  Semi-trailer, 50-ton, Tank Transporter

Notes and references
Notes

Bibliography
Norman, Michael, AFV Profile No. 38 Conqueror Heavy Gun Tank Profile Publications.

Military vehicles of the United Kingdom
FV Series